

Mimbara Conservation Park is a protected area in the Australian state of South Australia located in the locality of Worlds End about  north-east  of the state capital of Adelaide and about  south-east of the town of Burra.

The conservation park consists of the following land in the cadastral unit of the Hundred of Bright - Allotments 100 and 101 in Deposited Plan 92164 and Section 223. The land first received protected area status as a conservation park proclaimed under the National Parks and Wildlife Act 1972 on 26 March 2015. A separate proclamation made on the same day confirmed the preservation of “certain existing and future rights of entry, prospecting, exploration or mining” in respect to the land. Its name is derived from the clan name used by the Ngadjuri aboriginal people for the land associated with the conservation park.

The conservation park is categorised as an IUCN Category VI protected area.

See also
Protected areas of South Australia

References

External links
Webpage on the Protected Planet website
Webpage on BirdsSA website

Conservation parks of South Australia
Protected areas established in 2015
2015 establishments in Australia
Mid North (South Australia)